Vincenzo Camilleri (born 6 March 1992) is an Italian professional footballer who plays as a defender for  club Imolese.

Career
Born in Gela, Sicily, Camilleri began his career with the youth team of Reggina, and made his first team debut on 19 December 2007 as a half-time substitute in a Coppa Italia 2007–08 home game against Inter, which ended in a 4–1 loss for Camilleri's side. Later in February 2008 he became the subject of a controversial approach from English club Chelsea. In March 2008, after his 16th birthday, he left Reggina to move to England and join the Chelsea club academy; he consequently received a two-month ban by the Italian Federation due to breach of transfer rules, caused by Camilleri's parents not having asked permission to Reggina before entering talks with Chelsea; the ban applied only on Italian domestic games. The Italian Federation also agreed to suspend indefinitely Camilleri from playing at youth international level with Italy; he was playing at Under-16 level at the time of his move to Chelsea. However, the youngster ultimately failed to settle in England and was allowed to return to Reggina later in January 2009.

On 19 April 2009 Camilleri made his Serie A debut for Reggina as a substitute for Luca Vigiani in an away win to Atalanta. Later on 31 May 2009 he also marked his first appearance as a starter, playing 64 minutes in the final game of the season, ended in a 1–1 home draw to Siena. He was later confirmed as part of the Reggina roster for their 2009–10 Serie B campaign.

On 29 August 2010 Camilleri moved to Juventus in a loan deal, for €170,000, with an option for the Turin giants to acquire 50% of the player's transfer rights at the end of the season. His no.5 shirt of Reggina was stripped (given to Burzigotti) and took Gleison Santos's no.33 shirt at the start of season.

An injury crisis involving the first team gave Camilleri the opportunity to make his senior debut with the bianconeri on 1 December 2010, playing the whole 90 minutes of a 2010–11 UEFA Europa League game against Polish side Lech Poznań. His second appearance for Juventus came as a second-half substitute in the following UEFA Europa League game, this time at home against Manchester City. Since then, Camilleri did not play any other first team games, and he left Juventus at the end of the season after the club opted not to sign the player.

After returning to Reggina, Camilleri was once again excluded from the first-team squad and sent on loan to Lega Pro Prima Divisione minnows FeralpiSalò for the 2011–12 season. Camilleri also changed to wear no.92 shirt at the start of season (his year of birth).

In July 2012 Cagliari signed him in temporary deal, however he was injured.

On 10 July 2018, Camilleri signed with Serie C club Vibonese.

On 31 August 2019, he signed a two-year contract with Pistoiese. On 1 February 2021, he joined Viterbese on loan.

He signed for Serie D club Lamezia Terme in August 2021.

Camilleri joined Messina on 31 January 2022.

On 12 January 2023, Camilleri moved to Imolese.

Career statistics

References

External links
 Profile at AIC.Football.it 

1992 births
Living people
People from Gela
Sportspeople from the Province of Caltanissetta
Footballers from Sicily
Italian footballers
Italy youth international footballers
Association football defenders
Serie A players
Serie B players
Serie C players
Serie D players
Reggina 1914 players
Juventus F.C. players
FeralpiSalò players
Cagliari Calcio players
A.S.D. Barletta 1922 players
Brescia Calcio players
Paganese Calcio 1926 players
S.S. Teramo Calcio players
A.S.D. Sicula Leonzio players
U.S. Vibonese Calcio players
U.S. Pistoiese 1921 players
U.S. Viterbese 1908 players
F.C. Lamezia Terme players
A.C.R. Messina players
Chelsea F.C. players
Imolese Calcio 1919 players